Tropical Storm Kelly, known in the Philippines as Tropical Storm Daling, was a weak but destructive tropical storm that struck the Philippines in June 1981. A tropical disturbance organized into a tropical depression east of the Philippines on June 28. It tracked westward, reaching tropical storm on June 30 before hitting the central Philippines. Kelly weakened over the islands, but re-strengthened over the South China Sea, nearly attaining typhoon status on July 2. The system passed through the southern Hainan Island on July 3. The cyclone then crossed the Gulf of Tonkin as a weakening tropical storm, and made landfall in northern Vietnam on July 4 as a tropical storm. Kelly dissipated two days later inland.

Tropical Storm Kelly was the worst storm to affect the Philippines in eight months. Nine towns in an  area near the Mayon Volcano sustained flooding. Over  of railways lines were washed out. At least 800 homes were destroyed while  of rice fields were ruined. More than 3,600 individuals were displaced. Overall, damage totaled to $7.8 million (1981 USD).

Meteorological history

The origins of Tropical Storm Kelly can be traced back to an area of disturbed weather that was first detected by weather satellite imagery on June 25. Although the system was well-organized at this time, there was little evidence of a low-level circulation. Despite this, the Japan Meteorological Agency (JMA) started watching the system. Based on this, a Tropical Cyclone Formation Alert (TCFA) was issued that evening as the system moved west. However, on June 26, the TCFA was cancelled. Midday on June 28, following an increase in convection, the TCFA was re-issued. On that day, the Philippine Atmospheric, Geophysical and Astronomical Services Administration (PAGASA) also monitored the storm and assigned it with the local name Daling. After further development and a subsequent TCFA, the Joint Typhoon Warning Center (JTWC) classified the system as a tropical depression on June 30.

At 0600 UTC on June 30, the JTWC upgraded the depression into Tropical Storm Kelly. Twelve hours later, the JMA followed suit. At this time, Tropical storm Kelly moved ashore along the central Philippines. Due to land interaction, the tropical cyclone became less organized. Six hours after landfall, the JTWC downgraded Kelly into a depression, even though the JMA maintained Kelly as a tropical storm thorough its passage through the country. After emerging into the South China Sea, Kelly resumed deepening. At 0600 UTC on July 1, the JTWC re-upgraded Kelly into a tropical storm. Several hours later, the JTWC upgraded Kelly to a typhoon. Thereafter, the storm's eye became less defined and the surrounding convection weakened. On the evening of July 3, the eye collapsed as Kelly skirted southern Hai-nan. Due to land interaction, Kelly continued to weaken and early on July 4, the JTWC downgraded the typhoon into a tropical storm. Later that morning, the eye briefly re-developed over the Gulf of Tonkin; however, no re-intensification occurred as Kelly remained poorly organized. On July 5, the JTWC stopped monitoring the system as it had moved inland. The JMA followed suit the next day.

Impact and aftermath
Tropical Storm Kelly was the worst storm to affect the Philippines in eight months. Mudslides were reported along the slopes of the Mayon volcano, as a result, many nearby villages were destroyed. Some people were buried under rocks and debris due to mudslides. Nine towns in an  area were flooded. Huts and rice feels were inundated by mud in debris in parts of Legaspi, Daragan, Ligao, and Camalig. The towns of Ligao, Oas, Camalig and Guinobatan were the worst affected by Kelly. Although winds were not very strong, many rivers overflowed their banks. More than 3,600 persons lost their homes.

One hundred ninety-two fatalities were reported, including 120 casualties in the Albay Province and five in Ligao. Nine cities sustained fatalities near the Mayon volcano, Twelve children also died. Nine individuals were also listed missing and 30 were injured. Most of the fatalities were due to drownings. Overall, damage totaled to $7.8 million, including $3.7 million from infrastructure. Losses were estimated at $1.1 million. Following the storm, relief teams were sent in to provide aid such as rice and sardines for the homeless. A few days following Kelly, the island nation was struck by Tropical Storm Lynn, which was responsible for further destruction.

See also

Tropical Storm Bebinca (2013)
Tropical Storm Rumbia (2013)
Tropical Storm Zita
Tropical Storm Koni

Notes

References

1981 disasters in the Philippines
1981 Pacific typhoon season
Typhoons in the Philippines
Western Pacific severe tropical storms
Kelly